Kim Chang-dong, better known as Canna, is a South Korean professional League of Legends player for Dplus KIA. He made his debut during KeSPA Cup 2019.

He was a trainee of T1 before being promoted to the team.

Early life 
His role model is Khan.

His in-game name was based on his favourite anime character, Kanna Kamui, from Miss Kobayashi's Dragon Maid.

Career

Season 9 
During his time as trainee, he and four other trainees from T1, Ellim, Mask, Gumayushi and Kuri, competed in the 2019 LoL Amateur Tournament. The team was called 'T1 rookies', and they won the tournament.

On November 26, 2019, T1 announced that Canna would be joining as part of the roster. His first game after the announcement was against Gen.G during KeSPA Cup 2019, and his first champion used was Aatrox, which he won.

Season 10 
He played his first LCK game on February 7, 2020, against Hanwha Life Esports. He and his team finished the split in second place, which qualified them to the second round of playoffs.

On April 25, 2020, he and his team won the LCK Spring finals. This was his first LCK title, which made him a 'Royal Roader'.

Season 11
He was included in the roster for 2021 League of Legends World Championship.

On November 25, 2021, he was transferred to Nongshim RedForce before the 2022 Spring Split.

Accomplishments

Individual awards 

 2020 LCK Summer Split All-Pro 2nd Team

References

Notes

External links 
 

Living people
South Korean esports players
2000 births
T1 (esports) players
League of Legends top lane players
Twitch (service) streamers